Streptomyces gobitricini is a bacterium species from the genus of Streptomyces which has been isolated from soil in Russia.

See also 
 List of Streptomyces species

References

Further reading

External links
Type strain of Streptomyces gobitricini at BacDive -  the Bacterial Diversity Metadatabase

gobitricini
Bacteria described in 1958